Satter is a surname. Notable people with the surname include:

Beryl Satter (born 1959), American historian
David Satter (born 1947), American journalist
Gustave Satter (1832–1879), Austrian classical composer and pianist
Jack Satter, American baseball team owner and philanthropist
Jonathan Satter (born 1969), American businessman
Muneer Satter (born 1960), American investor and philanthropist
Rodney J. Satter (1925–2011), American politician
Ruth Lyttle Satter (1923–1989), American botanist
Tina Satter, American playwright and theatre director

See also
Sater (disambiguation)